Aspergillus qinqixianii is a species of fungus in the genus Aspergillus which has been isolated from desert soil from the Taklimakan desert in China. It is from the Nidulantes section. Aspergillus qinqixianii produces 
asteltoxin, asperthecin, emericellin, 2-ω-hydroxyemodin, shamixanthones, terrein, curvularin and dehydrocurvularin.

Growth and morphology

A. qinqixianii has been cultivated on both Czapek yeast extract agar (CYA) plates and Malt Extract Agar Oxoid® (MEAOX) plates. The growth morphology of the colonies can be seen in the pictures below.

References

Further reading 
 
 

qinqixianii
Fungi described in 2000